Sing Sian Yer Pao Daily News formerly Sing Sian Yer Pao  is a Thai newspaper that is published in Chinese language. It was founded by millionaire Aw Boon Haw, a Chinese Hakka diaspora, as a sister newspaper of the "Star Newspapers" in Singapore, Malaysia and Hong Kong as well as other locations. However, by ownership, they are currently not related; sister newspapers of Sing Sian Yer Pao currently is the publication by Nanfang Media Group of the People's Republic of China.

The publisher of Sing Sian Yer Pao also published Sing Thai Wan Pao in the past.

History
Sing Sian Yer Pao was first published in 1950 by Eng Aun Publishing Co., Ltd. (Eng Aun is the first two words of Eng Aun Tong). Since its foundation, it was owned by Aw Boon-haw and his extended family member until recent years.

From 1971 until 2005, the chairman of the publisher of the newspaper was Lee Aik-sim (Lee A. Santipongchai), husband of Aw Cheng-sin ( or Suri Santipongchai), the daughter of late Aw Boon-par; Boon-par was the young brother of Boon Haw. In the 1960s, the chairman of the publisher was Aw Kow, son of Boon-haw and cousin of Cheng-sin, while the editor-in-chief in the 1960s was Jimmy Wu, who also served sister newspaper Sing Tao Daily in 1951. It was reported that he served as the editor-in-chief in Sing Tao before his arrival to Thailand.

Lee Aik-sim and Aw Cheng-sin were also the directors of the Thai subsidiary of Haw Par Brothers International, a listed company in 1971; They resigned in January 1972, after the family controlled listed company was takeover in June 1971. The Thai subsidiary was sold by the listed company in 1972. Also due to the new laws in Singapore and Malaysia regarding media ownership, the Thai edition of the "Star Newspapers", were parted away with its Singapore and Malaysia counterpart, as the latter were no longer owned by Aw family; the Hong Kong editions, such as Sing Tao Daily, was owned by Sally Aw, daughter of Aw Boon-haw since 1954, which have a bitter relationship with her Singapore-based family.

According to a periodical, in 1997 the publisher of Sing Sian Yer Pao was known as Sing Pao Limited, with Lee Aik-sim and his wife were the principal shareholders. In 2005, the managing director of the publisher was their daughter.

In 2010 Sadawut Taechaubol acquired the publisher from Lee Aik-sim. The newspaper changed to use simplified Chinese characters to publish, in order to response to drop in the number of readers. According to managing director and executive editor Tommy Tan in an interview, the newspaper now targets Chinese tourists and investors who are visiting Thailand.

In 2013 a partnership agreement was signed with Chinese media conglomerate  to publish the newspaper.

Notes

References

External links
  

Newspapers published in Thailand
Chinese-language newspapers (Simplified Chinese)
Chinese-language newspapers (Traditional Chinese)
Aw family
Family-owned companies
Chinese-language mass media in Thailand